This is a list of films featuring comedian Jack Benny.  Benny's career lasted from the early 20thj century until his death in 1974. In Jack Benny's first film he starred along with Conrad Nagel as master of ceremonies in The Hollywood Revue of 1929, which was a big role for Jack at the time. Benny wouldn't start getting well known until his own radio program in 1934. The Hollywood Revue is also the oldest known form of Jack Benny in color with the last sequence being filmed originally in color, which was common for a musical in 1929.

References

Benny, Jack
Benny, Jack
Jack Benny